James Milo Alexander (February 7, 1815May 27, 1871) was an African-American businessperson and politician in Phillips County, Arkansas. Alexander was a successful businessperson and the first African-American justice of the peace in Arkansas.

Born into slavery in North Carolina, his enslaver taught him how to read and write. After they moved to Arkansas, which was then a frontier region, he allowed Alexander to establish his own business, a barbershop. Though his business prospered and grew to include the sale of dry goods, he remained in bondage until purchasing his own freedom and that of several family members in 1860. After the war, Alexander was active in Republican politics and served in a number of political offices in Helena, Arkansas including as postmaster, school trustee, grand jury member, and as a representative to the Arkansas House of Representatives.

Family
Five of his seven children attended Oberlin College in Ohio. His fourth child, John Hanks Alexander (18641894) was the first African-American officer in the United States armed forces to hold a regular command position and the second African-American graduate of the United States Military Academy. Another son, Titus, was a political organizer in California in the 1920s who helped convince African-Americans to support the Democratic Party through the National Negro Democratic Congress.

See also
 List of African-American officeholders during Reconstruction

References

1815 births
1871 deaths
People from Helena, Arkansas
Barbers
Republican Party members of the Arkansas House of Representatives
African-American state legislators in Arkansas
19th-century American politicians
Businesspeople from Arkansas
African-American businesspeople
Free Negroes
African-American politicians during the Reconstruction Era
African-American school board members
19th-century American businesspeople